is a Japanese television drama starring Hiroyuki Sanada and Nanako Matsushima. It aired during the summer of 1997 in Japan and in 2001 on KONG-TV in the United States. The original 12 episodes were split into 14 for the U.S. showing. A Story of Love dealt with social issues including poverty in first world countries and class barriers in Tokyo.

Plot outline
Shuichiro Harashima (Hiroyuki Sanada), an upper-class and work-driven businessman, falls in love with Kaori Fujimura (Nanako Matsushima), a lower-class downtown sweetheart, and fights to save the doomed building in which she lives. Rumored to be cold-hearted and cruel, his love for Kaori and his growing friendship with her brother-in-law, Konosuke Shimodaira (Koji Tamaki), change him into a kind and caring person.

Extended plot

Shuichiro Harashima is a cold-hearted businessman, whose only goal in life is to work hard and make money. After his father died when he was a child, he inherited the Harashima Conglomerate, a large company with new plans to knock down homes in the poorer parts of Tokyo to build new ones for richer people. He is powerful, cruel, merciless, and corrupted in his dealings at work, leaving him extremely lonely in his personal life. His plans for the future are cut short when he discovers he has an advanced case of stomach cancer and will be dead within six months. While at the doctor's office, he meets Konosuke Shimodaira, a local do-gooder whose big heart normally causes more trouble than it helps. When Harashima lends Konosuke 50 yen to pay his doctor's bill, Konosuke insists on paying it back straight away. He takes him to a bar where Harashima meets Konosuke's friends Nakahata, who has a habit of lying and gambling, "Sensei", who is trying to get into law school, and Yosaku, who has very bad manners.

After drinking too much, Konosuke takes Harashima home and puts him up for the night. The next day, after leaving, Harashima realizes he's left the watch his father dropped when he died. But before he can go back and get it, he gets a phone call from the company. Harashima becomes ruthless and hard in dealing with the problem with the rival companies who had blackened his name in the press. He carries on with his daily routine, including visiting the main Harashima store, where his father had started out. He stays after everyone has gone home, thinking about his father and. as he leaves, he is mistaken for a worker at the store by a gardener dropping off a plant for the main display.

By a strange twist of fate, he bumps into Kaori Fujimura, a poor, loving young woman who lives and works in the world ruled by Harashima. She mistakes him for the gardener, despite his smart dress, and presumes he's getting ready for a date. When Kaori notices Harashima's jacket gets dusty, she insists on cleaning it for him. He sits and listens to how she feels about her work and the Harashima store. She explains that though the store is becoming less popular and she dislikes the owner (Harashima), she doesn't want the store to fold. This makes Harashima curious and he is already bewitched by Kaori's beauty and her sunny, optimistic nature. Though he is unaware at first, he realizes on their second meeting that he has fallen head-over-heels in love with her.

With the events that occur, Harashima begins to realize what the values of friendship, loyalty, and love mean—but will he be able to reverse the fate of Kaori and Konosuke's doomed homes before his fate catches up with him?

Cast

Hiroyuki Sanada as Shuichiro Harashima
Koji Tamaki as Konosuke Shimodaira
Nanako Matsushima as Kaori Fujimura
Naho Toda as Mayako Mizukoshi
Saya Takagi as Misao Fujimura
Yoko Saito as Hirano
Yoshimasa Kondo as Norihiko Nakahata
Yuuichi Haba as Dept. Chief Domoto
Bsaku Satoh as Sensei
Kenta Satoi as Director Ninagawa
Yosuke Mikami as Shinpei Shimpaira

Main characters

Shuichiro Harashima
He inherited Harashima Enterprises from his father when he was only nine. Harashima is 35 years old. Originally they just had a main store and small chain stores, but Harashima expanded it thought Japan and other parts of Asia. His father died telling him that love was just in the mind, leaving Harashima cruel, cold-hearted and selfish. Though he agreed to marry Mayako, daughter of a powerful politician, he wishes for it to improve his company's standing not for love. Harashima finds out he is going to die in just six months and wishes to finish his work and seal the company safely before his death. However, upon meeting Kaori, he falls in love with her and is unable to stop thinking about her. Though he discourages Konosuke's attempts to become friends with him, he starts to (slowly) begins to care about others and not just his company. He was born on December 4, 1961.

Kaori Fujimura
Kaori is everything the other women in Harashima's life are not. She's modest, selfless and poor, which makes her very attractive to him. Despite her rough start in life, she has come through and tried her best to make something of herself. She finds that she can relate well to Harashima because of how much they have in common, e.g., they are both orphans. When Kaori was quite young, she was in love with a man who she was going to marry, but he has cheated on her leaving her heartbroken. Kaori took a job at the Harashima main store because it brought her so much joy as a child; looking at the beautiful displays made her want to create them when she grew up so she could bring the same amount of joy to other poor children. Her over-protective sister, who always reminds Kaori of her habit of trusting people to easily, scolds Kaori often. Kaori falls deeply in love with Harashima, as he does with her but they find it hard to be accepted by their friends and families as they belong to different classes in society. She's twenty-three-years old and lives with her elder sister, Misao.

Konosuke Shimodaira
Konosuke is the exact opposite of Harashima and yet they share similar histories. His father died with a smile on his face, telling him that he should respect and care for his friends, that love is a wonderful feeling that should be acted on and treated carefully, and that being good to others will always win the day. Most of the time, this theory backfires on him, but then again, so does Harashima's theory. Nonetheless, he argues to Harashima that he has lived a happier life than he has without money and with just his friends and family. Konosuke has feelings for Kaori's sister, but due to his selfless attitude to life he doesn't realise it nor does he realise that Misao feels the same about him.

Mayako Mizukoshi
She is twenty-five-years old, Harashima's fiancée and daughter of a big-time politician. All her life she had dreamt of marrying someone she truly loved and she is upset at the fact Harashima doesn't love her. Troubled by the fact that Harashima seems to have fallen in love with Kaori, she at first attempts to stop him from seeing her. She doesn't hold it against her and is moved by Kaori's generosity and kindness. Despite the fact she loves Harashima, too, she thinks that if she allows Harashima to see Kaori, he'll become tired of her. However, after they promise not see each other again and Mayako finds them together. In the end, her engagement to Harashima is broken off and she goes to Europe to study art, inspired by Kaori.

Misao Fujimura
Misao is thirty years old and takes her responsibility of being Kaori's guardian very seriously despite the fact Kaori has grown up. When their parents died, Misao raised and looked after Kaori with the help of Konosuke and his family. She works at the factory with Konosuke and the others, and tends to call everyone "Idiot" if they do something to displease her. She has feelings for Konosuke but never has a chance to tell him as he is too wrapped up in Harashima and Kaori's affair.

Secondary characters

Hirano
Harashima's outstanding secretary who is the only person who Harashima trusts, even though he doesn't realise it. She is a loyal and devoted servant to Harashima. She has many contacts which in able her to help Harashima with many cases. At one point, she helps Konosuke find Harashima when he disappears.

Dept. Chief Domoto
Merciless and cruel, Domoto has is eye of reaching the top of Harashima Enterprises. He often attempts to overthrow Harashima but is normally backed into a corner by Harashima's talent at being one step ahead of everyone. Domoto in described by others as a less attractive and less tolerable version of Harashima, who copies everything about Harashima, right down to his walk.

Mizukoshi
Mayako's father and a wealthy politician who cares only for money. He is selfish, bitter toward those who have little money and knows little about love. He uses Mayako as a way to get Harashima's money. He feels that anything can be solved with money. Upon finding that Kaori is Harashima's lover, he sends his secretary to give Kaori a "pay-off" in Harashima's name, without his knowledge. When Kaori sends the money back, the only reason he can imagine why she refused it was because it wasn't enough.

Norihiko Nakahata
Konosuke's friend who has a terrible gambling problem. As his debts rose he was forced the ask illegal dealers for a loan, who later came back to haunt him and blamed Konosuke who had agreed to be the guarantor. He tries to sell Harashima's father's watch to pay the debts, but it turned out be worthless. However, Harashima paid off his debts for him. Nakahata has a sick mother and Konosuke paid the fare for him to go and see her.

"Sensei"
Another one of Konosuke's friends, his real name is Sakai. Hoping to graduate law school and become a lawyer, the others rely on him to give them law advice. He is constantly turning to look in his law book to see if actions people make is legal. He takes over the factory after the president dies and even considers taking Harashima's offer of saving 10 of the workers. However, he decides to go down fighting with the other workers.

Yusaku
He's in his late twenties. He is one of the famous three who hang around with Konosuke, and he has a very bad temper. He's been in love with Kaori ever since high school, but she has never shown interest in him. When he finds out Kaori is Harashima's lover, he becomes terribly rude and says hurtful things to her. This is the only way he can deal with his rejection of her and his jealousy of Harashima.

Shinpei
Konosuke's nine-year-old son who regrets his poor life but loves his father very much. His mother tries to gain complete custody of him but he decides to stay with his father.

Zenkichi
Zenkichi owns the restaurant where Konosuke and the others live. He is very kind as he lend his money to his friends and the many causes they make. When Yusaku insults and has hostile feelings toward Kaori over her relationship with Harashima, he throws him out for not knowing how to treat a friend. His nature is similar to Konosuke's.

Episode summaries
There were 12 episodes in the original Japanese airing. They were expanded into 14 episodes for the US release.

Episode 1
Harashima finds out he has an incurable diseases and has little time left. Konosuke and the others face unemployment by the Harashima group. Meanwhile, Kaori meets an unknown stranger while working late at night. Later, Harashima returns to Konosuke in search of his watch only to discover that Nakahata has run away taking all the wages from the factory. Meanwhile, the unknown stranger comes to ask Kaori for a date. Elsewhere, Harashima finds out one of his workers has betrayed the company to one of their rivals.

Episode 3
Shinpei goes missing and everyone rushes out of work to find him. The man from Harashima Enterprises is there! The stranger and Kaori join in the search and find Shinpai at the theme park. While everything is going so well, however, Kaori finds out the stranger is Harashima and runs off in humiliation.

Episode 4
The president of the factory dies after meeting the wrath of Harashima. As a result, Konosuke goes to see him and finds out who Harashima really is. Meanwhile, in Harashima's other life, he is overjoyed to see Kaori and even more thrilled that she has forgiven him. Mayako witnesses this and starts to worry that Harashima is having an affair.

Episode 5
Misao catches on to Kaori and Harashima's secret "affair" and confides in Konosuke her concerns. Meanwhile, "Sensei" confides in Harashima that people from Harashima Enterprises had approached him with an offer to save 10 of the workers at the factory. Konosuke realises Harashima's will never change and he tells him he must never go near Kaori again.

Episode 6
Kaori meets Mayako and is surprised when she claims to not mind if Harashima is seeing her. Misao finds out who Harashima and forbids Kaori from seeing him but Kaori runs away. When hearing this, Harashima rushes out into the night to find her — leaving Mayako cold.

Episode 7
News gets out that Kaori spent the night with a wealthy man as Konosuke and Misao try to make sense of Kaori's feelings for Harashima. Mizukoshi finds out about Harashima's affair with Kaori, and Kaori's love is nearly dashed when a man claiming to be Harashima's servant offers her money in return for her silence.

Issues in A Story of Love

Poverty in developed countries
Class barriers in Tokyo
Homelessness
Debts and money problems
Illegal dealings with money
Death/loss
Cancer/premature death
Unemployment
Arranged marriage
Inter-class marriage/romance/affairs

External links
Fan Site (Taiwanese)
Jdorama
English Fan site

Japanese drama television series
1997 Japanese television series debuts
1997 Japanese television series endings
Fuji TV dramas